"Don't Rain on My Parade" is a popular song from the 1964 musical Funny Girl. It was also featured in the 1968 movie version of the musical. The song was written by Bob Merrill and Jule Styne. Both the movie and stage versions feature Barbra Streisand performing the song. In 2004, it finished No. 46 in AFI's 100 Years...100 Songs survey of top tunes in American cinema.

Streisand has sung the song live on many occasions, including during her comeback tour Barbra Streisand: The Concert Tour (1993–1994), Timeless Live In Concert Tour (1999–2000), Streisand: The Tour (2006–2007), and Barbra: The Music, The Mem'ries, The Magic (2016). The instrumental of this song can be heard during the Overture of the stage show, the film and on Streisand's 2006–2007 Tour.

There is a reprise version of this song with alternate lyrics which served as the finale for the stage show. This number was cut from the film. Streisand sang this version live for the first time since her run in the original Broadway production as an encore during her 2006–07 Tour.

Barbra Streisand versions
 "Don't Rain On My Parade" from Funny Girl: Original Broadway Cast Recording (1964) – 2:46
 "Don't Rain On My Parade (Reprise)" from Funny Girl: Original Broadway Cast Recording (1964) – 2:07
 "Don't Rain On My Parade" from Funny Girl: Original Soundtrack Recording (1968) – 2:45
 "Don't Rain On My Parade" (Live) from Live Concert At The Forum (1972) – 2:39
 "Don't Rain On My Parade" (Live) from Barbra Streisand ... and Other Musical Instruments (1973) – 2:38
 "I'm Still Here/Everybody Says Don't/Don't Rain On My Parade" (Live) from Barbra: The Concert (1994) and The Concert: Highlights (1995) – 4:26
 "I'm The Greatest Star/Second Hand Rose/Don't Rain On My Parade" (Live) from Timeless: Live in Concert (2000) – 5:25
 "Don't Rain On My Parade (Live)" from Live In Concert 2006 (Target Exclusive Version Only) (2007) – 2:57
 "Don't Rain On My Parade (Reprise)" from Live In Concert 2006 (2007) – 3:31

Cover versions
The song has been covered by many artists; among the notable ones are Nancy Wilson in 1964, Bobby Darin in 1966, Shirley Bassey in 1965, Only Men Aloud! in 2008, and Japan in 1978 on their Adolescent Sex album.

 The Bobby Darin version was used in the film American Beauty and the trailer for Catch Me If You Can.	
 The song was covered by Diana Ross and The Supremes on their 1968 album Sing and Perform Funny Girl.	
 Robin Williams also sang this song while dressed as Streisand during a scene from Mrs. Doubtfire.
 LaToya London sang the song on the third season of American Idol. Judy Garland, Liza Minnelli, Diana Ross and Donna Summer also sang this song live.
 Lois Griffin sang parts of this song in Family Guy episode "Mind Over Murder".
 The song was performed by Connie and Carla (Toni Collette and Nia Vardalos) in the movie Connie and Carla.
 In the American musical series Glee, Rachel Berry (Lea Michele) repeatedly covered the song, the first time being in "Sectionals". The song serves as her theme. Santana Lopez (Naya Rivera) covered the song in "Frenemies" – the song was also released on the albums Glee: The Music, Volume 2, Glee: The Music, The Complete Season One, and Glee: The 3D Concert Movie Motion Picture Soundtrack. 
 Michele also performed the song at the 2010 Tony Awards.
 The Dorothys performed the song on Over the Rainbow as a group number.	
 Mireille Mathieu sang this song on her 2006 album.
 The British band Japan covered the song on their 1978 debut album Adolescent Sex, and released it as their debut single the same year.
 International champion barbershop quartet Max Q covered it on their 2009 album, Journey.
 On April 2, 2018, Joey McIntyre performed a live cover of the song for the Broadway Backwards benefit at the Al Hirschfeld Theatre
 In 2016, Yeardley Smith sang this song as Lisa in The Simpsons in "How Lisa Got Her Marge Back".

References 

1964 songs
Barbra Streisand songs
Nancy Wilson (jazz singer) songs
Songs from Funny Girl (musical)
Songs with music by Jule Styne
Songs written by Bob Merrill
Songs from Funny Girl (film)